KJSR (103.3 FM, "103.3 The Eagle") is an American classic rock formatted radio station licensed to serve the community in the surveyed area of Greater Tulsa.  The facility is owned by Cox Media Group and the broadcast license is held by Cox Radio. "103.3 The Eagle" studios is located in South Tulsa. KJSR'S main transmitter facilities are located in western Wagoner County, near Coweta, Oklahoma.

History
The station signed on the air in 1966 as religious KORU, owned by famed Tulsa-based televangelist Oral Roberts. The studios and transmitter were located in the iconic Prayer Tower on the ORU campus. Oral Roberts sold the station in 1972 to Central Broadcast Company, at which time it became an urban contemporary (or soul) format station as KKUL "K-Cool"; the transmitter was also moved from the Prayer Tower. In 1977, KKUL was sold to William H. "Bill" Payne; the next year, it changed to Top 40 as KTFX "The Superfox 103".

In November 1979, KTFX changed to a country format as "The Country Fox", which lasted until 1995. It was the first station to air a full-time country music format on FM in the Tulsa market.

In 1995, KTFX was sold to Cox Radio, and flipped to a classic hits format as KJSR "Star 103.3"; the format would later morph into classic rock. The KTFX calls and country format moved to 102.3 (now News/Talk KRMG-FM) in 1995.

On October 9, 2012, at midnight, KJSR rebranded as "Rock 103", adding the Billy Madison Show and shifting the music library to add more 80s and 90s harder rock. On April 10, 2014, KJSR re-imaged as "103.3 The Eagle" and dropped the Billy Madison Show, maintaining the classic rock format, albeit somewhat softer.

103.3 The Eagle simulcasts on Cox Communications digital cable channel 1981 in Tulsa. KOKI also provides traffic and weather information.

References

External links

FCC History Cards for KJSR

JSR
Classic rock radio stations in the United States
Cox Media Group
Radio stations established in 1966
1966 establishments in Oklahoma